Miyanshahr or Mianshahr may refer to:
 Miyanshahr, Kerman
 Miyanshahr, Sistan and Baluchestan